Gamasiyab Rural District may refer to:
 Gamasiyab Rural District (Hamadan Province)
 Gamasiyab Rural District (Kermanshah Province)